Joseph David Wozencroft Pigott (born 24 November 1993) is an English professional footballer who plays as a striker for League One club Portsmouth on loan from Ipswich Town.

Career

Charlton Athletic
Born in Maidstone, Kent, Pigott began his career with Charlton Athletic and was offered a professional contract in January 2012. He made his professional debut on 6 August 2013 in a 4–0 victory over Oxford United in the League Cup, scoring Charlton's fourth goal from the penalty spot, and made his Football League debut as a 90th-minute substitute for Simon Church in a 2–1 win at home to Leicester City on 31 August. Pigott was rewarded three days later with a new three-year contract. On 30 January 2014, Pigott joined League One club Gillingham on a one-month loan. He debuted two days later as a 70th-minute substitute in a 3–2 victory at home to Port Vale. On his first start, Pigott scored his first goal for Gillingham with the opener in a 2–1 win away to Carlisle United on 8 February. His loan was extended by a further month on 27 February, but was later recalled by manager José Riga on 24 March, having scored one goal from seven appearances for Gillingham. Pigott's first appearance for Charlton following his return came as a 58th-minute substitute in a 3–0 defeat away to Derby County on 29 March and finished 2013–14 with 14 appearances and one goal for the club.

On 11 September 2014, Pigott joined League Two club Newport County on loan until mid-November. He debuted two days later in a 3–2 victory at home to Northampton Town and scored his first two goals in a 4–1 win at home to AFC Wimbledon on 27 September. Pigott scored an equaliser from 30 yards into the top corner in a 1–1 draw at home to Accrington Stanley on 25 October, having entered the match as a 62nd-minute substitute. Newport manager Justin Edinburgh confirmed that Pigott would return to Charlton following the expiration of his loan spell as the club "couldn't afford to keep him". He made his final appearance for Newport in a 2–2 draw at home to Exeter City on 16 November, finishing the loan spell with three goals from 11 appearances. Upon his return to Charlton, Pigott made his first appearance of 2014–15 for the club as a half-time substitute in a 2–0 defeat away to Blackburn Rovers on 20 December. He was introduced as an 89th-minute substitute against the same club on 3 January 2015 in the FA Cup, which finished as a 2–1 defeat.

On 9 January 2015, Pigott was loaned to League Two club Southend United, initially for one month. He debuted a day later in a 0–0 draw at home to Plymouth Argyle and scored his first goal the following week in a 3–2 win away to Oxford United. This was followed up with a goal in the following match, a 2–1 win away to Portsmouth. Pigott's loan at Southend was extended until the end of the season on 30 January, before scoring twice in Southend's 2–0 victory at home to Cheltenham Town on 10 February. He was introduced as a 60th-minute substitute in the 2015 League Two play-off Final at Wembley Stadium on 23 May 2015, in which he scored a goal in stoppage time of extra time against Wycombe Wanderers to take the match to a penalty shoot-out. Pigott scored Southend's first penalty in the 7–6 shoot-out victory, which saw the team win promotion to League One. He completed the loan spell with seven goals from 23 appearances.

On 8 August 2015, Pigott returned to Southend on a five-month loan with a view to a permanent transfer. He made his first appearance following his return later that day in a 1–1 draw away to Fleetwood Town on the opening day of 2015–16. Pigott scored his first two goals of the season in a 2–1 win away to Crewe Alexandra on 29 September. This marked the start of a run of five goals from four matches, which saw him nominated for the PFA League One Player of the Month award for October. Southend opted not to sign Pigott permanently and he returned to Charlton in January 2016, having scored five goals from 28 appearances. Pigott was loaned out again on 28 January 2016, joining League Two club Luton Town until the end of 2015–16, linking back up with Luton manager Nathan Jones who had previously been his youth coach at Charlton. He scored his first two goals in a 3–2 win away to Oxford United on 16 April, which saw him earn a place in the Football League Team of the Week. Pigott went on to score a day later in a 2–1 win away to Carlisle United and completed the loan spell with four goals from 15 appearances. Upon his return to Charlton, the club announced that he would be released following the expiration of his contract.

Cambridge United
On 8 July 2016, Pigott signed for League Two club Cambridge United on a one-year contract. He debuted on the opening day of 2016–17 in a 1–1 draw at home to Barnet and scored his first goal in a 1–0 win away to Shrewsbury Town in the EFL Trophy on 30 August. However, Pigott struggled to force his way into the first team and was loaned to National League club Maidstone United on 27 January 2017 until the end of 2016–17. He debuted a day later as a 54th-minute substitute in a 2–0 defeat away to Solihull Moors and scored his first goal in a 4–2 victory at home to Chester on 18 February. Pigott completed the loan spell with 17 appearances and six goals. He was one of six players released by Cambridge when his contract expired at the end of 2016–17.

Maidstone United
On 31 May 2017, Pigott joined Maidstone United permanently on a one-year contract.

AFC Wimbledon
On 15 January 2018, Pigott signed for League One club AFC Wimbledon on a contract of undisclosed length for an undisclosed fee. He scored four minutes into his AFC Wimbledon debut in a 2–0 victory at home to Blackpool five days later, having entered the match as a 73rd-minute substitute. On 28 August, Pigott scored after 77 seconds in Wimbledon's EFL Cup match against Premier League club West Ham United, but was substituted after Rod McDonald was sent off later in the first half; the Dons went on to lose 3–1. He made history as the first player to score a goal at the new Plough Lane stadium on 3 November 2020 against Doncaster Rovers; he also scored Wimbledon's second in the eventual 2-2 draw. Pigott said that it had been the “toughest decision” of his career after he decided not to sign a new contract with Wimbledon at the end of the 2020–21 season.

Ipswich Town
On 12 July 2021, Pigott joined Ipswich Town on a free transfer. He signed a three-year contract with the club. After making his debut for Ipswich on the opening day of the 2021–22 season against Morecambe, he scored his first goal for the club in the following match against Burton Albion on 14 August, a goal that was initially ruled as a Thomas O'Connor own goal, but was later awarded to Pigott following a review by the Dubious Goal Panel.

In July 2022 he joined Portsmouth on loan. He scored his first goal for Portsmouth in an EFL Cup win over Cardiff City on 9 August 2022.

Career statistics

Honours
Southend United
Football League Two play-offs: 2014–15

Individual
EFL League One Player of the Month: April 2019
AFC Wimbledon Player of the Year: 2020–21

References

External links

Joe Pigott profile at the Ipswich Town F.C. website

1993 births
Living people
Sportspeople from Maidstone
Footballers from Kent
English footballers
Association football forwards
Charlton Athletic F.C. players
Bromley F.C. players
Gillingham F.C. players
Newport County A.F.C. players
Southend United F.C. players
Luton Town F.C. players
Cambridge United F.C. players
Maidstone United F.C. players
AFC Wimbledon players
Ipswich Town F.C. players
Portsmouth F.C. players
National League (English football) players
English Football League players